USNS Neptune (ARC-2), was the lead ship in her class of cable repair ships in U.S. Naval service. The ship was built by Pusey & Jones Corp. of Wilmington, Delaware, Hull Number 1108, as the  USACS William H. G. Bullard named for Rear Adm. William H. G. Bullard. She was the first of two Maritime Commission type S3-S2-BP1  ships built for the US Army Signal Corps near the end of World War II. The other ship was the Albert J. Myer, which later joined her sister ship in naval service as the USNS Albert J. Myer (T-ARC-6).

The ship was assigned to and largely worked on installation of the Sound Surveillance System (SOSUS) under its unclassified name for installation, Project Caesar.

Function 

Neptunes assignments were typically to transport, deploy, retrieve and repair submarine cables, tow cable plow and acoustic projectors, and conduct acoustic, hydrographic, and bathymetric surveys. Civilian cable engineers and specialist were involved during cable or surveying operations in addition to a Navy crew of nine officers and 142 enlisted personnel. In addition to cable operations and surveys for Project Caesar the ship supported experimental efforts and other projects.

Career 
After completion for the US Army Signal Corps in February 1946, Neptune was handed to the  Maritime Commission and placed in the James River reserve fleet on 2 March 1946.

In 1952 Neptune was assigned to Project Caesar, the unclassified name for the installation phase of SOSUS. The system's mission was declassified in 1991. On 17 February 1953 the ship was named Neptune and withdrawn from the reserve fleet. The ship then went to the Bethlehem Steel Co. in Baltimore, Maryland for a number of modifications: e.g., electric cable machinery (in place of steam), precision navigation instrumentation, and a helicopter platform over the fantail. Cable drums  in diameter and bow sheaves spanning  were among the more visible modifications. On 1 June 1953 the ship was commissioned USS Neptune (ARC-2).

The ship's operations were classified so few specific ones are public. One was the 1962 connection of the array once terminating at Naval Facility Cape May to Naval Facility Lewes necessitated by destruction of the Cape May shore station in the "Ash Wednesday" Storm.

From December 1965 through March 1966 Neptune was overhauled in Boston. In 1973, Neptune transferred to the Military Sealift Command (MSC), was re-designated T-ARC-2, and continued operations with an MSC civil service crew.

Only two of the four cable ships available for Project Caesar had been designed and built as cable ships, the others being conversions and lacking some critical features needed for cable operations. In hearings for the 1980 appropriations the Navy requested an increase of $9.6 million over an original estimate of $14.5 million in Neptune conversion budget for a total of $24.1 million. The revised estimate was based on actual Myer conversion costs. In particular the Navy was questioned about conversion of merchant type hulls to cable ships and answered that conversion would be more expensive. Further, charter of commercial cable ships was done when needed, but expensive and those ships were not always available when required. The AT&T  was used on occasion to lay trunk cable at a daily cost of $30,000 vice Neptune's $19,200. Scheduled Project Caesar work required a minimum of three Navy cable ships.

Neptune was extensively modernized in 1982 by General Dynamics Corporation in Quincy, Massachusetts. That work included new turbo-electric engines. Neptune and sister ship Albert J. Myer, with Skinner Uniflow Reciprocating Steam Engines, were the last ships in the Navy to operate using reciprocating steam engines.

Neptune performed cable repair duties all over the world until 1991, when she'd been in service for some 38 years. During her career, she received a Navy E ribbon in 1988.

Inactivated in 1991, the same year in which the SOSUS mission was declassified, she was placed in the James River reserve fleet near Ft. Eustis, VA on 24 September 1991. The ex-Neptune was removed from the fleet 6 December 1994 to stripped. The ship was dismantled and recycled by International Shipbreaking Ltd. of Brownsville, TX in late 2005.

Footnotes

References 

 
 The Ships and Aircraft of the U.S. Fleet, Norman Polmar, Naval Institute Press, 13th edition, 1984.
 OPNAV NOTICE 1650, Master List of Unit Awards and Campaign Medals, 9 March 2001.
 MARAD press release 14-05, 28 July 2005, Maritime Administration announcement of the disposal of ex-Meyer & ex-Neptune.

External links
 Cable ship, William H. G. Bullard before launching
 Erecting bow sheave casting.
 Trial trip of the cable ship, William H. G. Bullard
 
 USS Neptune (ARC-2) / USNS Neptune (T-ARC-2)
 The USNS NEPTUNE - Cable Layer

 

Type S3-S2-BP ships of the United States Army
Ships built by Pusey and Jones
1945 ships
World War II auxiliary ships of the United States
Cold War auxiliary ships of the United States
Neptune-class cable ships